Povilaitis is a Lithuanian-language surname.

Augustinas Povilaitis
Angela Povilaitis
Monika Povilaitytė, Lithuanian beach volleyball player
Stasys Povilaitis

Lithuanian-language surnames